David Wilfred Abse (15 March 1915  – 4 November 2005) was a Welsh psychiatrist.

Abse was born in Cardiff, a brother of the poet Dannie Abse (1923–2014) and the politician Leo Abse (1917–2008).  During and after World War II, he served in the Royal Army Medical Corps. In 1941, he participated in the examination of the Nazi leader Rudolf Hess, who had been captured in Scotland during an unsuccessful peace mission. Abse was later stationed in India, eventually rising to the rank of Major.

A psychoanalyst, Abse received his medical training from University of London, then emigrated to the United States to become professor of psychiatry at the University of North Carolina at Chapel Hill. He spent the greater part of his career in Charlottesville, Virginia, where he was a professor of psychiatry at the University of Virginia from 1962 until 1980. Abse was known for his work in group therapy and hysteria, and contributed to the Journal of Nervous and Mental Disease. It was said that his younger brother Leo got his habit of Freudian allusion in his speeches from Wilfred.

Abse's work in group analysis was influenced by S.H. Foulkes, who was in London at the same time as Abse. Abse wrote that in group-analytic psychotherapy, each patient's unconscious defense struggle becomes manifest, producing unconscious regression. Feelings about early figures from childhood are aroused and, through transference, fixed on the group leader (or conductor). Childish feelings of jealousy and rivalry lead participants to become concerned about which members in the group the group leader prefers.

Selected works
The diagnosis of hysteria (Williams and Wilkins, Baltimore, 1950)
Speech and reason: language disorder in mental disease (John Wright, Bristol, 1971)
Clinical notes on group-analytic psychotherapy (University Press of Virginia, Charlottesville, 1974)Marital & sexual counseling in medical practice, edited by D. Wilfred Abse, Ethel M. Nash, Lois M.R. Louden (Harper & Row, Medical Dept., Hagerstown, 2nd edition, 1974)
Hysteria and Related Mental Disorders : an approach to psychological medicine (Wright, Bristol, 1987)

References

1915 births
2005 deaths
Welsh psychiatrists
Medical doctors from Cardiff
Welsh Jews
Group psychotherapists
British people of Polish-Jewish descent
Wilfred
British Army personnel of World War II
Royal Army Medical Corps officers
British expatriates in the United States
Military personnel from Cardiff